Erebia maurisius is a  butterfly found in the  East Palearctic (Altai Mountains, Sayan Mountains) that belongs to the browns family.

Description from Seitz

E. maurisius Esp. (36 e). The reddish brown band of the forewing is separated by the veins into a number of elongate spots — usually 6; the cell is more or less filled in with ferruginous brown, and behind the cross-vein there are 2 somewhat diffuse narrow streaks, which extend towards the distal band, in which they disappear. The hindwing has 6 round russet-yellow spots. On the underside the band of the forewing is lighter, and the space between the band and the darkened base is russet-brown; inner and distal margins blackish brown. The hindwing dark brown in the male, with very small, point-like, russet yellow spots. In the female the hindwing is grey-brown beneath, being finely dusted with greyish yellow, the ochre-yellow dots at the distal margin are prolonged to small stripes. In the cell there is a whitish yellow diffuse spot on the upperside. The fringes grey-brown in the male, whitish grey in the female. Antenna finely ringed, the club white on the inside, black-brown on the outside. Middle of July, on the Altai, from 2000 to 2700 m, on grassy slopes.

See also
List of butterflies of Russia

References

External links
Images representing Erebia maurisius at Barcodes of Life
Russian insects

Satyrinae